The Tony Hancock Show is a black-and-white British sketch show starring Tony Hancock and was broadcast on ITV by the franchise contractor Associated-Rediffusion for two series in 1956 and 1957, either side of the first television series of Hancock's Half Hour. It was written by Eric Sykes, Larry Stephens, John Jose and (for the few last episodes) Ray Galton and Alan Simpson. All the episodes were broadcast live.

Cast
Tony Hancock
June Whitfield
John Vere
Clive Dunn
Dick Emery
Sam Kydd
Hattie Jacques
Eric Sykes
Sid James

Episodes

Series One (1956)
Episode One (27 April 1956)
Episode Two (4 May 1956)
Episode Three (11 May 1956)
Episode Four (18 May 1956)
Episode Five (25 May 1956)
Episode Six (1 June 1956)

Series Two (1956–57)
"Hancock - The Man of the Moment" (16 November 1956)
"Honneur Et Fidelité" (30 November 1956)
"The Further Adventures of Hancock" (14 December 1956)
"Weather or Not" (28 December 1956)
"Napoleon and Josephine" (11 January 1957)
"The Odd Job Man" (25 January 1957)

Missing episodes
No episodes of the second series are thought to have survived.

References

External links
 

1956 British television series debuts
1957 British television series endings
1950s British television sketch shows
ITV comedy
Lost television shows
ITV sketch shows